Soze may refer the following people:
Keyser Söze, a fictional character and the main antagonist in the 1995 film The Usual Suspects
Jaja Soze, pseudonym of the British hiphop artist, street activist, and entrepreneur Elijah Kerr